Slavoj Žižek (born 21 March 1949) is a Slovenian philosopher, cultural theorist and public intellectual. He is international director of the Birkbeck Institute for the Humanities at the University of London, visiting professor at New York University and a senior researcher at the University of Ljubljana's Department of Philosophy. He primarily works on continental philosophy (particularly Hegelianism, psychoanalysis and Marxism) and political theory, as well as film criticism and theology.

Žižek is the most famous associate of the Ljubljana School of Psychoanalysis, a group of Slovenian academics working on German Idealism, Lacanian psychoanalysis, ideology critique, and media criticism. His breakthrough work was 1989's The Sublime Object of Ideology, his first book in English, which was decisive in the introduction of the Ljubljana School's thought to English-speaking audiences. He has written over 50 books in multiple languages. The idiosyncratic style of his public appearances, frequent magazine op-eds, and academic works, characterised by the use of obscene jokes and pop cultural examples, as well as politically incorrect provocations, have gained him fame, controversy and criticism both in and outside academia.

In 2012, Foreign Policy listed Žižek on its list of Top 100 Global Thinkers, calling him "a celebrity philosopher", while elsewhere he has been dubbed the "Elvis of cultural theory" and "the most dangerous philosopher in the West". Žižek has been called "the leading Hegelian of our time", and "the foremost exponent of Lacanian theory". A journal, the International Journal of Žižek Studies, was founded by professors David J. Gunkel and Paul A. Taylor to engage with his work.

Life and career

Early life
Žižek was born in Ljubljana, PR Slovenia, Yugoslavia, into a middle-class family. His father Jože Žižek was an economist and civil servant from the region of Prekmurje in eastern Slovenia. His mother Vesna, a native of the Gorizia Hills in the Slovenian Littoral, was an accountant in a state enterprise. His parents were atheists. He spent most of his childhood in the coastal town of Portorož, where he was exposed to Western film, theory and popular culture. When Žižek was a teenager his family moved back to Ljubljana where he attended Bežigrad High School. Originally wanting to become a filmmaker himself, he abandoned these ambitions and chose to pursue philosophy instead.

Education
In 1967, during an era of liberalization in Titoist Yugoslavia, Žižek enrolled at the University of Ljubljana and studied philosophy and sociology.

Žižek had already begun reading French structuralists prior to entering university, and in 1967 he published the first translation of a text by Jacques Derrida into Slovenian. Žižek frequented the circles of dissident intellectuals, including the Heideggerian philosophers Tine Hribar and Ivo Urbančič, and published articles in alternative magazines, such as Praxis, Tribuna and Problemi, which he also edited. In 1971 he accepted a job as an assistant researcher with the promise of tenure, but was dismissed after his Master's thesis was denounced by the authorities as being "non-Marxist". He graduated from the University of Ljubljana in 1981 with a Doctor of Arts in Philosophy for his dissertation entitled The Theoretical and Practical Relevance of French Structuralism. He spent the next few years in what was described as "professional wilderness", also fulfilling his legal duty of undertaking a year-long national service in the Yugoslav army in Karlovac.

Academic career
During the 1980s, Žižek edited and translated Jacques Lacan, Sigmund Freud, and Louis Althusser. He used Lacan's work to interpret Hegelian and Marxist philosophy.

In 1986, Žižek completed a second doctorate (Doctor of Philosophy in psychoanalysis) at the University of Paris VIII under Jacques-Alain Miller, entitled "La philosophie entre le symptôme et le fantasme".

Žižek wrote the introduction to Slovene translations of G. K. Chesterton's and John Le Carré's detective novels.
In 1988, he published his first book dedicated entirely to film theory, Pogled s strani. The following year, he achieved international recognition as a social theorist with the 1989 publication of his first book in English, The Sublime Object of Ideology.

Žižek has been publishing in journals such as Lacanian Ink and In These Times in the United States, the New Left Review and The London Review of Books in the United Kingdom, and with the Slovenian left-liberal magazine Mladina and newspapers Dnevnik and Delo. He also cooperates with the Polish leftist magazine Krytyka Polityczna, regional southeast European left-wing journal Novi Plamen, and serves on the editorial board of the psychoanalytical journal Problemi. Žižek is a series editor of the Northwestern University Press series Diaeresis that publishes works that "deal not only with philosophy, but also will intervene at the levels of ideology critique, politics, and art theory".

Political career
In the late 1980s, Žižek came to public attention as a columnist for the alternative youth magazine Mladina, which was critical of Tito's policies, Yugoslav politics, especially the militarization of society. He was a member of the Communist Party of Slovenia until October 1988, when he quit in protest against the JBTZ trial together with 32 other Slovenian intellectuals. Between 1988 and 1990, he was actively involved in several political and civil society movements which fought for the democratization of Slovenia, most notably the Committee for the Defence of Human Rights. In the first free elections in 1990, he ran as the Liberal Democratic Party's candidate for the former four-person collective presidency of Slovenia.

Public life

In 2003, Žižek wrote text to accompany Bruce Weber's photographs in a catalog for Abercrombie & Fitch. Questioned as to the seemliness of a major intellectual writing ad copy, Žižek told The Boston Globe, "If I were asked to choose between doing things like this to earn money and becoming fully employed as an American academic, kissing ass to get a tenured post, I would with pleasure choose writing for such journals!"

Žižek and his thought have been the subject of several documentaries. The 1996 Liebe Dein Symptom wie Dich selbst! is a German documentary on him. In the 2004 The Reality of the Virtual, Žižek gave a one-hour lecture on his interpretation of Lacan's tripartite thesis of the imaginary, the symbolic, and the real. Zizek! is a 2005 documentary by Astra Taylor on his philosophy. The 2006 The Pervert's Guide to Cinema and 2012 The Pervert's Guide to Ideology also portray Žižek's ideas and cultural criticism. Examined Life (2008) features Žižek speaking about his conception of ecology at a garbage dump. He was also featured in the 2011 Marx Reloaded, directed by Jason Barker.

Foreign Policy named Žižek one of its 2012 Top 100 Global Thinkers "for giving voice to an era of absurdity".

In 2019, Žižek began hosting a mini-series called How to Watch the News with Slavoj Žižek on the RT network. In April, Žižek debated psychology professor Jordan Peterson at the Sony Centre in Toronto, Canada over happiness under capitalism versus Marxism.

Personal life
Žižek has been married four times and has two sons, Tim and Kostja. His second wife was Slovene philosopher and socio-legal theorist Renata Salecl, fellow member of the Ljubljana School of Psychoanalysis. His third wife was Argentinian model and Lacanian scholar Analia Hounie, who he married in 2005. Currently, he is married to Slovene journalist, author and philosopher, Jela Krečič.

Aside from his native Slovene, Žižek is a fluent speaker of Serbo-Croatian, French, German and English.

Taste
In the 2012 Sight & Sound critics' poll, Žižek listed his 10 favourite films: 3:10 to Yuma, Dune, The Fountainhead, Hero, Hitman, Nightmare Alley, On Dangerous Ground, Opfergang, The Sound of Music, and We the Living. In his tour of The Criterion Collection closet, he chose Trouble in Paradise, Sweet Smell of Success, Picnic at Hanging Rock, Murmur of the Heart, The Joke, The Ice Storm, Great Expectations, Roberto Rossellini's History Films, City Lights, a box set of Carl Theodor Dreyer's films, Y tu mamá también and Antichrist.

In an article called 'My Favourite Classics', Žižek states that Arnold Schoenberg's Gurre-Lieder is the piece of music he would take to a desert island. He goes on to list other favourites, including Beethoven's Fidelio, Schubert's Winterreise, Mussorgsky's Khovanshchina and Donizetti's L'elisir d'amore. He expresses a particular love for Wagner, particularly Das Rheingold and Parsifal. He ranks Schoenberg over Stravinsky, and insists on Eisler's importance among Schoenberg's followers.

Žižek often lists Franz Kafka, Samuel Beckett and Andrei Platonov as his "three absolute masters of 20th century literature". He ranks/prefers Varlam Shalamov over Aleksandr Solzhenitsyn, Marina Tsvetaeva and Osip Mandelstam over Anna Akhmatova, Daphne du Maurier over Virginia Woolf, and Samuel Beckett over James Joyce.

Thought and positions
Žižek and his thought have been described by many commentators as "Hegelo-Lacanian". In his early career, Žižek claimed "a theoretical space moulded by three centres of gravity: Hegelian dialectics, Lacanian psychoanalytic theory, and contemporary criticism of ideology", designating "the theory of Jacques Lacan" as the fundamental element. In 2010, Žižek instead claimed that for him Hegel is more fundamental than Lacan—"Even Lacan is just a tool for me to read Hegel. For me, always it is Hegel, Hegel, Hegel."—while in 2019, he claimed that "For me, in some sense, all of philosophy happened in [the] fifty years" between Immanuel Kant's Critique of Pure Reason (1781) and the death of Georg Wilhelm Friedrich Hegel (1831). Alongside his academic, theoretical works, Žižek is a prolific commentator on current affairs and contemporary political debates.

Subjectivity
For Žižek, although a subject may take on a symbolic (social) position, it can never be reduced to this attempted symbolisation, since the very "taking on" of this position implies a separate 'I', beyond the symbolic, that does the taking on. Yet, under scrutiny, nothing positive can be said about this subject, this 'I' that eludes symbolisation; it cannot be discerned as anything but "that which cannot be symbolised". Thus, without the initial, attempted, failed symbolisation, subjectivity cannot present itself. As Žižek writes in his first book in English: "the subject of the signifier is a retroactive effect of the failure of its own representation; that is why the failure of representation is the only way to represent it adequately."

Žižek attributes this position on the subject to Hegel, particularly his description of man as "the night of the world", and to Lacan, with his description of the barred, split subject, who he sees as developing the Cartesian notion of the cogito. According to Žižek, these thinkers, in insisting on the role of the subject, run counter to "culturalist" or "historicist" positions held by thinkers such as Louis Althusser and Michel Foucault, which posit that "subjects" are bound by and reducible to their historical/cultural(/symbolic) context.

Political theory

Ideology
Žižek's Lacanian-informed theory of ideology is one of his major contributions to political theory; his first book in English, The Sublime Object of Ideology, and the documentary The Pervert's Guide to Ideology, in which he stars, are among the well-known places in which it is discussed. Žižek believes that ideology has been frequently misinterpreted as dualistic and, according to him, this misinterpreted dualism posits that there is a real world of material relations and objects outside of oneself, which is accessible to reason.

For Žižek, as for Marx, ideology is made up of fictions that structure political life; in Lacan's terms, ideology belongs to the symbolic order. Žižek argues that these fictions are primarily maintained at an unconscious level, rather than a conscious one. Since, according to psychoanalytic theory, the unconscious can determine one's actions directly, bypassing one's conscious awareness (as in parapraxes), ideology can be expressed in one's behaviour, regardless of one's conscious beliefs. Hence, Žižek breaks with orthodox Marxist accounts that view ideology purely as a system of mistaken beliefs (see False consciousness). Drawing on Peter Sloterdijk's Critique of Cynical Reason, Žižek argues that adopting a cynical perspective is not enough to escape ideology, since, according to Žižek, even though postmodern subjects are consciously cynical about the political situation, they continue to reinforce it through their behaviour.

Freedom
Žižek claims that (a sense of) political freedom is sustained by a deeper unfreedom, at least under liberal capitalism. In a 2002 article, Žižek endorses Lenin's distinction between formal and actual freedom, claiming that liberal society only contains formal freedom, "freedom of choice within the coordinates of the existing power relations", while prohibiting actual freedom, "the site of an intervention that undermines these very coordinates." In an oft-quoted passage from a book published in the same year, he writes that, in these conditions of liberal censorship, "we 'feel free' because we lack the very language to articulate our unfreedom". In a 2019 article, he writes that Marx "made a valuable point with his claim that the market economy combines in a unique way political and personal freedom with social unfreedom: personal freedom (freely selling myself on the market) is the very form of my unfreedom." However, in 2014, he rejects the "pseudo-Marxist" total derision of 'formal freedom', claiming that it is necessary for critique: "When we are formally free, only then we become aware how limited this freedom actually is."

Theology
Žižek has asserted that "Atheism is a legacy worth fighting for" in The New York Times. However, he nonetheless finds extensive conceptual value in Christianity, particularly Protestantism: the subtitle of his 2000 book The Fragile Absolute is "Or, Why Is the Christian Legacy Worth Fighting For?". Hence, he labels his position 'Christian Atheism', and has written about theology at length.

In The Pervert's Guide to Ideology, Žižek suggests that "the only way to be an Atheist is through Christianity", since, he claims, atheism often fails to escape the religious paradigm by remaining faithful to an external guarantor of meaning, simply switching God for natural necessity or evolution. Christianity, on the other hand, in the doctrine of the incarnation, brings God down from the 'beyond' and onto earth, into human affairs; for Žižek, this paradigm is more authentically godless, since the external guarantee is abolished.

Communism
Although sometimes adopting the title of 'radical leftist', Žižek also controversially insists on identifying as a communist, even though he rejects 20th century communism as a "total failure", and decries "the communism of the 20th century, more specifically all the network of phenomena we refer to as Stalinism as "maybe the worst ideological, political, ethical, social (and so on) catastrophe in the history of humanity." Žižek justifies this choice by claiming that only the term 'communism' signals a genuine step outside of the existing order, in part since the term 'socialism' no longer has radical enough implications, and means nothing more than that one "care[s] for society"

In Marx Reloaded, Žižek rejects both 20th-century totalitarianism and "spontaneous local self-organisation, direct democracy, councils, and so on". There, he endorses a definition of communism as "a society where you, everyone would be allowed to dwell in his or her stupidity", an idea with which he credits Fredric Jameson as the inspiration.

Žižek has labelled himself a "communist in a qualified sense". When he spoke at a conference on The Idea of Communism, he applied (in qualified form) the 'communist' label to the Occupy Wall Street protestors:

Electoral politics
In May 2013, during Subversive Festival, Žižek commented: "If they don't support SYRIZA, then, in my vision of the democratic future, all these people will get from me [is] a first-class one-way ticket to [a] gulag." In response, the center-right New Democracy party claimed Žižek's comments should be understood literally, not ironically.

Just before the 2017 French presidential election, Žižek stated that one could not choose between Macron and Le Pen, arguing that the neoliberalism of Macron just gives rise to neofascism anyway. This was in response to many on the left calling for support for Macron to prevent a Le Pen victory.

In 2022, Žižek expressed his support for the Slovenian political party Levica (The Left) at its 5th annual conference.

Support for Donald Trump's election
In a 2016 interview with Channel 4, Žižek said that were he American, he would vote for Donald Trump in the 2016 United States presidential election:

These views were derisively characterised as accelerationist by Left Voice, and were labelled "regressive" by Noam Chomsky, who claimed that "it was the same point that people like him said about Hitler in the early ['30s]."

In 2019 and 2020, Žižek defended his views, saying that Trump's election "created, for the first time in I don't know how many decades, a true American left", citing the boost it gave Bernie Sanders and Alexandria Ocasio-Cortez.

However, regarding the 2020 United States presidential election, Žižek reported himself "tempted by changing his position", saying "Trump is a little too much". In another interview, he stood by his 2016 "wager" that Trump's election would lead to a socialist reaction ("maybe I was right"), but claimed that "now with coronavirus: no, no—no Trump. ... difficult as it is for me to say this, but now I would say 'Biden better than Trump', although he is far from ideal." In his 2022 book, Heaven in Disorder, Žižek continued to express a preference for Joe Biden over Donald Trump, stating "Trump was corroding the ethical substance of our lives", while Biden lies and represents big capital more politely.

Social issues
Žižek's views on social issues such as Eurocentrism, immigration and the LGBT movement have triggered criticism and accusations of bigotry.

Europe and Multiculturalism
In his 1997 article 'Multiculturalism, Or, The Cultural Logic of Multinational Capitalism', Žižek critiqued multiculturalism for privileging a culturally 'neutral' perspective from which all cultures are disaffectedly apprehended in their particularity because this distancing reproduces the racist procedure of Othering. He further argues that a fixation on particular identities and struggles corresponds to an abandonment of the universal struggle against global capitalism.

In his 1998 article 'A Leftist Plea for "Eurocentrism"', he argued that Leftists should 'undermine the global empire of capital, not by asserting particular identities, but through the assertion of a new universality', and that in this struggle the European universalist value of egaliberte (Etienne Balibar's term) should be foregrounded, proposing 'a Leftist appropriation of the European legacy'. Elsewhere, he has also argued, defending Marx, that Europe's destruction of non-European tradition (eg through imperialism and slavery) has opened up the space for a 'double liberation', both from tradition and from European domination.

In her 2010 article 'The Two Zizeks', Nivedita Menon criticised Žižek for focusing on differentiation as a colonial project, ignoring how assimilation was also such a project; she also critiqued him for privileging the European Enlightenment Christian legacy as neutral, 'free of the cultural markers that fatally afflict all other religions.' David Pavón Cuéllar, closer to Žižek, also criticised him.

In the mid-2010s, over the issue of Eurocentrism, there was a dispute between Žižek and Walter Mignolo, in which Mignolo (supporting a previous article by Hamid Dabashi, which argued against the centrality of European philosophers like Žižek, criticised by Michael Marder) argued, against Žižek, that decolonial struggle should forget European philosophy, purportedly following Frantz Fanon; in response, Žižek pointed out Fanon's European intellectual influences, and his resistance to being confined within the black tradition, and claimed to be following Fanon on this point. In his book Can Non-Europeans Think? (foreworded by Mignolo), Dabashi also critiqued Žižek for privileging Europe; Žižek argued that Dabashi slanderously and comically misrepresents him through misattribution, a critique supported by Ilan Kapoor.

Transgender issues
In his 2016 article "The Sexual Is Political", Žižek argued that all subjects are, like transgender subjects, in discord with the sexual position assigned to them. For Žižek, any attempt to escape this antagonism is false and utopian: thus, he rejects both the reactionary attempt to violently impose sexual fixity and the "postgenderist" attempt to escape sexual fixity entirely; he aligns the latter with 'transgenderism', which he claims does not adequately describe the behaviour of actual transgender subjects, who seek a stable "place where they could recognise themselves" (ie a bathroom that confirms their identity). Žižek argues for a third bathroom: a "GENERAL GENDER" bathroom that would represent the fact that both sexual positions (Žižek insists on the unavoidable "twoness" of the sexual landscape) are missing something and thus fail to adequately represent the subjects that take them on.

In his 2019 article "Transgender dogma is naive and incompatible with Freud", Žižek argued that there is "a tension in LGBT+ ideology between social constructivism and (some kind of biological) determinism", between the idea that gender is a social construct, and the idea that gender is essential and pre-social. He concludes the essay with a "Freudian solution" to this deadlock:

Che Gossett criticized Žižek for his use of the "pathologising" term "transgenderism" throughout the 2016 article, and for writing "about trans subjectivity with such assumed authority while ignoring the voices of trans theorists (academics and activists) entirely", as well as for purportedly claiming that a "futuristic" vision underlies so-called "transgenderism", ignoring present-day oppression. Sam Warren Miell and Chris Coffman, both psychoanalytically inclined, have separately criticized Žižek for conflating transgenderism and postgenderism; Miell further criticised the 2014 article for rehearsing homophobic/transphobic clichés (including Žižek's designation of inter-species marriage as a possible "anti-discriminatory demand"), and misusing Lacanian theory; Coffman argued that Žižek should have engaged with contemporary Lacanian trans studies, which would have shown that psychoanalytic and transgender discourses were aligned, not opposed. In response to the title of the 2019 article, McKenzie Wark had t-shirts made with the transgender flag and "Incompatible with Freud" printed on them.

Žižek defended his 2016 article in two follow-up pieces. The first addresses purported misreadings of his position, while the second is a more sustained defence (against Miell) of the article's application of Lacanian theory, to which Miell responded in turn. Douglas Lain also defended Žižek, claiming that context makes that it clear that Žižek is "not opposed [to] the struggle of LGBTQ people" but is instead critiquing "a phony liberal ideology that set up the terms of the LGBTQ struggle", "a certain utopian postmodern ideology that seeks to eliminate all limits, to eliminate all binaries, to go beyond norms because the imposition of a limit is patriarchal and oppressive."

Other
Žižek wrote that the convention center in which nationalist Slovene writers hold their conventions should be blown up, adding, "Since we live in the time without any sense of irony, I must add I don't mean it literally." 

In 2013, Žižek corresponded with imprisoned Russian activist and Pussy Riot member Nadezhda Tolokonnikova.

He criticized Western military interventions in developing countries and wrote that it was the 2011 military intervention in Libya "which threw the country in chaos" and the U.S.-led invasion of Iraq "which created the conditions for the rise" of the Islamic State.

In an opinion article for The Guardian, Žižek argued in favour of giving full support to Ukraine after the Russian invasion and for creating a stronger NATO in response to Russian aggression, later arguing that it would also be a tragedy for Ukraine to yoke itself to western neoliberalism. He compared the struggle of Ukraine against the occupiers to the Palestinians' struggle against the Israeli occupation.

Criticism and controversy

Inconsistency and ambiguity
Žižek's philosophical and political positions are not always clearly understandable, and his work has been criticized for a failure to take a consistent stance. While he has claimed to stand by a revolutionary Marxist project, his lack of vision concerning the possible circumstances which could lead to successful revolution makes it unclear what that project consists of. According to John Gray and John Holbo, his theoretical argument often lacks grounding in historical fact, which makes him more provocative than insightful.

In a very negative review of Žižek's book Less than Nothing, the British political philosopher John Gray attacked Žižek for his celebrations of violence, his failure to ground his theories in historical facts, and his 'formless radicalism' which, according to Gray, professes to be communist yet lacks the conviction that communism could ever be successfully realized. Gray concluded that Žižek's work, though entertaining, is intellectually worthless: "Achieving a deceptive substance by endlessly reiterating an essentially empty vision, Žižek's work amounts in the end to less than nothing."

Žižek's refusal to present an alternative vision has led critics to accuse him of using unsustainable Marxist categories of analysis and having a 19th-century understanding of class. For example, Ernesto Laclau argued that "Žižek uses class as a sort of deus ex machina to play the role of the good guy against the multicultural devils."

In his book Living in the End Times, Žižek suggests that the criticism of his positions is itself ambiguous and multilateral:

Stylistic confusion
Žižek has been criticized for his chaotic and non-systematic style: Harpham calls Žižek's style "a stream of nonconsecutive units arranged in arbitrary sequences that solicit a sporadic and discontinuous attention". O'Neill concurs: "a dizzying array of wildly entertaining and often quite maddening rhetorical strategies are deployed in order to beguile, browbeat, dumbfound, dazzle, confuse, mislead, overwhelm, and generally subdue the reader into acceptance." Noam Chomsky deems Žižek guilty of "using fancy terms like polysyllables and pretending you have a theory when you have no theory whatsoever", adding that his views are often too obscure to be communicated usefully to common people.

Conservative thinker Roger Scruton claims that:

Careless scholarship
Žižek has been accused of approaching phenomena without rigour, reductively forcing them to support pre-given theoretical notions. For example, Tania Modleski alleges that "in trying to make Hitchcock 'fit' Lacan, he [Žižek] frequently ends up simplifying what goes on in the films". Similarly, Yannis Stavrakakis criticises Žižek's reading of Antigone, claiming it proceeds without regard for both the play itself and the interpretation, given by Lacan in his 7th Seminar, which Žižek claims to follow. According to Stavrakakis, Žižek mistakenly characterises Antigone's act (illegally burying her brother) as politically radical/revolutionary, when in reality "Her act is a one-off and she couldn't care less about what will happen in the polis after her suicide."

Noah Horwitz alleges that Žižek (and the Ljubljana School to which Žižek belongs) mistakenly conflate the insights of Lacan and Hegel, and registers concern that such a move "risks transforming Lacanian psychoanalysis into a discourse of self-consciousness rather than a discourse on the psychoanalytic, Freudian unconscious."

Plagiarism
Žižek's tendency to recycle portions of his own texts in subsequent works resulted in the accusation of self-plagiarism by The New York Times in 2014, after Žižek published an op-ed in the magazine which contained portions of his writing from an earlier book. In response, Žižek expressed perplexity at the harsh tone of the denunciation, emphasizing that the recycled passages in question only acted as references from his theoretical books to supplement otherwise original writing.

In July 2014, Newsweek reported that online bloggers led by Steve Sailer had discovered that in an article published in 2006, Žižek plagiarized long passages from an earlier review by Stanley Hornbeck that first appeared in the journal American Renaissance, a publication condemned by the Southern Poverty Law Center as the organ of a "white nationalist hate group". In response to the allegations, Žižek stated:

Works

Bibliography

Filmography

In popular culture

Apollo 440#Slavoj Žižek

 British electronic and alternative rock band Apollo 440 used samples of Žižek in the song "Love is Evil" in the 2012 album The Future's What It Used to Be.

 2022 video game Dying Light 2 Stay Human by Polish studio Techland features the character Stavros (otherwise known as the Fish Monk) who is most likely an homage to Žižek.

References

Citations

External links

 
 Slavoj Žižek on Big Think
 Slavoj Žižek Faculty Page at European Graduate School
 Žižek's entry in the Internet Encyclopedia of Philosophy
 Žižek bibliography at Lacanian Ink magazine
 Column archive at The Guardian
 Column archive at Jacobin
 
 
 
 Wendy Brown, Costas Douzinas, Stephen Frosh, and Zizek at the London Critical Theory Summer School – Friday Debate 2012
 

 
1949 births
20th-century atheists
20th-century essayists
20th-century non-fiction writers
20th-century Slovenian philosophers
20th-century Slovenian writers
21st-century atheists
21st-century essayists
21st-century non-fiction writers
21st-century Slovenian philosophers
21st-century Slovenian writers
Academic staff of European Graduate School
Academic staff of the University of Ljubljana
Academics of Birkbeck, University of London
Analysands of Jacques-Alain Miller
Anti-capitalists
Anti-consumerists
Aphorists
Atheist philosophers
Atheist theologians
Atheist writers
Cinephiles
Contemporary philosophers
Continental philosophers
Critical theorists
Criticism of capitalism
Critics of Islamism
Critics of multiculturalism
Critics of political economy
Critics of postmodernism
Critics of religions
Death of God theologians
Deleuze scholars
Epistemologists
Film theorists
Freudo-Marxism
Hegelian philosophers
Jacques Lacan
Liberal Democracy of Slovenia politicians
Living people
Logicians
Maoist theorists
Marxist theorists
Mass media theorists
Materialists
Media critics
Members of the Slovenian Academy of Sciences and Arts
Metaphysicians
Ontologists
Opinion journalists
Paris 8 University Vincennes-Saint-Denis alumni
People involved in plagiarism controversies
Philosophers of art
Philosophers of culture
Philosophers of education
Philosophers of history
Philosophers of logic
Philosophers of mind
Philosophers of nihilism
Philosophers of psychology
Philosophers of religion
Philosophers of social science
Philosophy writers
Political philosophers
Poststructuralists
Slovenian anti-fascists
Slovenian atheists
Slovenian communists
Slovenian essayists
Slovenian ethicists
Slovenian Marxist writers
Slovenian Marxists
Slovenian non-fiction writers
Slovenian political philosophers
Slovenian psychoanalysts
Slovenian socialists
Slovenian sociologists
Slovenian theologians
Social commentators
Social philosophers
Sociologists of art
Theorists on Western civilization
University of Ljubljana alumni
Writers about activism and social change
Writers about globalization
Writers about religion and science
Writers about the Soviet Union
Yugoslav dissidents